Oscar Miguel Cacho Malbernat Candela (2 February 1944 – 9 August 2019) was an Argentine footballer, who was the captain of Estudiantes de La Plata between 1967 and 1972, when the team won a local championship in 1967, three consecutive Copa Libertadores titles (1968 to 1970) and one Intercontinental Cup (1968), where he marked Manchester United's George Best. During one of the 1970 Intercontinental Cup games, he ripped off Joop van Daele's glasses and trampled on them claiming that he was "not allowed to play with glasses".

Before his retirement, he played for Boca Juniors in 1972 and Racing Club de Avellaneda in 1973.

After his career Malbernat would become a manager at various clubs all over South America including his former club Estudiantes on two occasions and other clubs in Paraguay, Ecuador, Chile and Peru. Most recently, Malbernat worked as manager of the youth divisions in Estudiantes.

Honours

Club
Estudiantes de La Plata
 Primera División Argentina (1): 1967 Metropolitano
 Copa Libertadores (2): 1968, 1970
 Copa Interamericana (1): 1968
 Copa Intercontinental (1): 1968

References

External links

Oscar Malbernat at El Crack  

1944 births
2019 deaths
Argentine footballers
Estudiantes de La Plata footballers
Boca Juniors footballers
Racing Club de Avellaneda footballers
Argentine Primera División players
Copa Libertadores-winning players
Argentine football managers
Cerro Porteño managers
Club Nacional de Football managers
Estudiantes de La Plata managers
Club Guaraní managers
Club Universitario de Deportes managers
Universidad San Martín managers
L.D.U. Quito managers
Barcelona S.C. managers
C.D. El Nacional managers
S.D. Quito managers
Audax Italiano managers
Cobreloa managers
Coquimbo Unido managers
Deportes Antofagasta managers
Provincial Osorno managers
Argentine expatriate sportspeople in Chile
Argentine expatriate sportspeople in Ecuador
Argentine expatriate sportspeople in Paraguay
Argentine expatriate sportspeople in Peru
Argentine expatriate sportspeople in Uruguay
Expatriate football managers in Chile
Expatriate football managers in Ecuador
Expatriate football managers in Paraguay
Expatriate football managers in Peru
Expatriate football managers in Uruguay
Footballers from La Plata
Association football defenders
Club Nacional managers